The Volvo Masters was the concluding official money event of the European Tour season until 2009, when it was replaced by the Dubai World Championship. The event was founded in 1988 and held at Valderrama Golf Club in Andalusia, Spain, except for a five-year period between 1997 and 2001 when Montecastillo Golf Club played host to the tournament.

The tournament reverted to its original name of "Volvo Masters" in 2005, having been known as the "Volvo Masters Andalucia" between 2000 and 2003 for sponsorship reasons. The prize money for the inaugural event was £351,690, and by 2008, this had increased to over €4 million, making it one of the richest events on the tour. The field consists of the top 60 leading money winners on the European Tour, and from 2005, an invitation has also been issued to the previous years winner regardless of their standing on the money list.

Prior to 2007, the Volvo Masters was held one week before The Tour Championship to allow golfers who are members of both the European and PGA Tours to participate, but this changed after the PGA Tour rescheduled their event to mid-September.

Following a one-year absence from the calendar, Valderama returned to the European Tour schedule in 2010 with the Andalucía Valderrama Masters under the sponsorship of Turismo Andaluz (Andalucia Government Tourism Organization).

Winners

Notes

References

External links
Official website
Coverage on the European Tour's official site

Former European Tour events
Golf tournaments in Spain
Annual sporting events in Spain
Recurring sporting events established in 1988
Recurring sporting events disestablished in 2008
1988 establishments in Spain
2008 disestablishments in Spain